Electric Magma is an instrumental heavy riff rock band from Toronto, Ontario, Canada. Electric Magma was formed between 2000-2001 by Tryg Smith, Tim Reesor and Tom Brouard.  Influenced by the stoner rock movement from the mid 1990s (Fu Manchu, Kyuss, Clutch, Corrosion of Conformity), Electric Magma is known for their improvised style of riff-based rock music.

Electric Magma has released seven full-length albums.  Smith and Reesor, the core songwriters, remain the sole founding members. All of Electric Magma's albums have been released by Around Ahead Music, the band's record label.

Electric Magma's 2012 release: Canadian Samurai II was mixed in California by Scott Reeder of Kyuss. The album cover features the artwork of Ken Kelly, who also painted the covers of the Kiss albums Destroyer and Love Gun.

Electric Magma's 7th full-length album SILVERBALL, was recorded in January 2015 in Toronto Ontario  and was produced and mixed by Ian Blurton. The album was released in July 2015 on vinyl. The album cover features an original oil painting by Robb Waters.

In the winter of 2017, the band started writing music for their 8th studio album, tentatively titled: "Astro Blaster 360". Four songs have been completed including: "Whatever Happened to the Bitchin Camaros", "Elcamino", "Dutch Oven" and "Diablo Red".

Line-up

Present
 Tryg Smith - Bass (2000–Present)
 Tim Reesor - Guitar (2000–Present)

Past
 Tom Brouard - drums (2001 - 2011, 2017–present)
 Mario Lunardo - drums (2011–12)
 Emilio Mammone - drums (2012–13)
 Neil Lukewich-Pheaton - Drums (2014 - 2015)
 Jesse Mackowycz - Drums (2017–2018)
 Jesse Labelle - vocals (2003 studio recording self-titled album)

Discography
 2003 - Self-Titled
 2004 - Karaoke Bitchslap (first instrumental album)
 2005 - Snail the Wah
 2007 - Coconut Bangers Ball
 2009 - Mud Shovel 
 2012 - Canadian Samurai II
 2015 -  Silverball

References
Audio interview 2011: Heavy Gauge Radio Interview

External links
 Official Site
 Encyclopedia Metallum

Canadian rock music groups
Musical groups from Toronto
Musical groups established in 2001
2001 establishments in Ontario